Walter Jones Bellamy (July 24, 1939 – November 2, 2013) was an American professional basketball player. A four-time NBA All-Star, he was inducted into the Naismith Memorial Basketball Hall of Fame.

College career

Bellamy chose to play basketball at Indiana University. About the experience, he recalled: "In the summer after my junior year of high school I played with some guys from Indiana. Indiana at the time was the closest school to the South that would accept African-Americans. It was an easy transition for me to make. Not that I was naive to what was going on in Bloomington in terms of the times, but it didn't translate to the athletic department or the classroom. Every relationship was good."

Bellamy graduated from Indiana University with the most school rebounds in a career with 1,087 in only 70 games, or 15.5 per game. He also averaged 20.6 points per game and shot 51.7 percent from the floor for his college career.  As a senior, Bellamy averaged 17.8 rebounds per game (still Indiana's record). He also holds the school records for most rebounds in a season (649) and most double-doubles in a career (59). In 2000, he was selected to Indiana University's All-Century Team.

In his final college game, he set an Indiana and Big Ten Conference record that still stands with 33 rebounds in an 82–67 win over Michigan. Bellamy was named an All-American in both his junior and senior year (1960 and 1961). Bellamy was the first Hoosier taken No. 1 in the 1961 NBA draft and the first Hoosier named NBA Rookie of the Year.

1960 Olympics
Bellamy was the starting center on the gold medal-winning 1960 American basketball team at the 1960 Summer Olympics. 10 of the 12 college players on the undefeated American squad went on to play professionally in the NBA, including fellow Big Ten player Terry Dischinger and fellow future Hall-of-Famers Jerry West, Oscar Robertson, and Jerry Lucas.

NBA career

Bellamy had a stellar 14-year career in the NBA, and was the NBA first overall draft pick in 1961. Bellamy was named the NBA Rookie of the Year in 1962 after having arguably one of the three greatest rookie seasons in NBA history along with Wilt Chamberlain and Oscar Robertson. His 31.6 points per game average that season is second all-time for a rookie to Wilt Chamberlain's 37.6, and the 19 rebounds per game he averaged that season is the third-best all-time rookie mark (to Chamberlain's 27 and Bill Russell's 19.6). No NBA rookie has since surpassed Bellamy's 973 field goals during the 1961–62 season. Bellamy also led the NBA in field goal percentage in his rookie season, and had a 23-point, 17-rebound performance in the 1962 NBA All-Star Game.

In the 1964–65 season, Bellamy scored 30 points and 37 rebounds in a win against the St. Louis Hawks. His 37 rebounds was his career-high in rebounds. Bellamy played with the Chicago Packers, which became the Baltimore Bullets, for his first four seasons before he was traded to the New York Knicks for Johnny Green, Johnny Egan, Jim Barnes, and cash a few games into the 1965–66 season.

Due to trades to teams with offset game schedules during the 1968–69 season when he was traded (with Howard Komives) from the Knicks to the Detroit Pistons for Dave DeBusschere, Bellamy set a still-standing record for NBA games played in a single season with 88, playing 35 games with the Knicks and 53 with the Pistons. He later played for several seasons with the Atlanta Hawks, and finished his career with the New Orleans Jazz.

Bellamy ended his NBA career with 20,941 points and 14,241 rebounds, and is a two-time Naismith Memorial Basketball Hall of Fame inductee, being inducted in 1993 for his individual career, and in 2010 as a member of the 1960 United States men's Olympic basketball team.

Personal life
After his retirement from the NBA, Bellamy was active with the NAACP, the Urban League and the YMCA in the Atlanta area.  He served as a Goodwill Ambassador and member of the Executive Committee of the NAACP's Georgia State Conference.

Bellamy was a member of Alpha Phi Alpha fraternity. His half-brother is professional boxer Ron Bellamy.

Bellamy died on November 2, 2013 at the age of 74. He was survived by his wife of 53 years, Helen Hollie Ragland Bellamy, son Derrin Bellamy, and two grandsons. He was buried at Atlanta's South-View Cemetery.

NBA career statistics

Regular season 

|-
| style="text-align:left;"| 
| style="text-align:left;"|Chicago
| 79 || – || 42.3 || .519 || – || .644 || 19.0 || 2.7 || – || – || 31.6
|-
| style="text-align:left;"| 
| style="text-align:left;"|Chicago
| 80 || – || 41.3 || .527 || – || .674 || 16.4 || 2.9 || – || – || 27.9
|-
| style="text-align:left;"| 
| style="text-align:left;"|Baltimore
| 80 || – || 42.4 || .513 || – || .651 || 17.0 || 1.6 || – || – || 27.0
|-
| style="text-align:left;"| 
| style="text-align:left;"|Baltimore
| 80 || – || 41.3 || .509 || – || .685 || 14.6 || 2.4 || – || – || 24.8
|-
| style="text-align:left;"| 
| style="text-align:left;"|Baltimore
| 8 || – || 33.5 || .452 || – || .597 || 12.8 || 2.3 || – || – || 19.0
|-
| style="text-align:left;"| 
| style="text-align:left;"|New York
| 72 || – || 42.8 || .512 || – || .627 || 16.0 || 3.0 || – || – || 23.2
|-
| style="text-align:left;"| 
| style="text-align:left;"|New York
| 79 || – || 38.1 || .521 || – || .636 || 13.5 || 2.6 || – || – || 19.0
|-
| style="text-align:left;"| 
| style="text-align:left;"|New York
| 82 || – || 32.9 || .541 || – || .662 || 11.7 || 2.0 || – || – || 16.7
|-
| style="text-align:left;"| 
| style="text-align:left;"|New York
| 35 || – || 32.5 || .507 || – || .619 || 11.0 || 2.2 || – || – || 15.2
|-
| style="text-align:left;"| 
| style="text-align:left;"|Detroit
| 53 || – || 38.2 || .512 || – || .663 || 13.5 || 1.9 || – || – || 18.8
|-
| style="text-align:left;"| 
| style="text-align:left;"|Detroit
| 56 || – || 20.9 || .547 || – || .562 || 7.1 || 1.0 || – || – || 10.0
|-
| style="text-align:left;"| 
| style="text-align:left;"|Atlanta
| 23 || – || 37.2 || .491 || – || .605 || 13.5 || 3.8 || – || – || 15.5
|-
| style="text-align:left;"| 
| style="text-align:left;"|Atlanta
| 82 || – || 35.5 || .493 || – || .604 || 12.9 || 2.8 || – || – || 14.7
|-
| style="text-align:left;"| 
| style="text-align:left;"|Atlanta
| 82 || – || 38.9 || .545 || – || .585 || 12.8 || 3.2 || – || – || 18.6
|-
| style="text-align:left;"| 
| style="text-align:left;"|Atlanta
| 74 || – || 37.9 || .505 || – || .538 || 13.0 || 2.4 || – || – || 16.1
|-
| style="text-align:left;"| 
| style="text-align:left;"|Atlanta
| 77 || – || 31.7 || .486 || – || .608 || 9.6 || 2.5 || .7 || .6 || 13.1
|-
| style="text-align:left;"| 
| style="text-align:left;"|New Orleans
| 1 || – || 14.0 || 1.000 || – || 1.000 || 5.0 || .0 || .0 || .0 || 6.0
|- class="sortbottom"
| style="text-align:center;" colspan="2"| Career
| 1,043 || – || 37.3 || .516 || – || .632 || 13.7 || 2.4 || .7 || .6 || 20.1
|- class="sortbottom"
| style="text-align:center;" colspan="2"| All-Star
| 4 || 3 || 20.8 || .500 || – || .526 || 7.5 || 1.0 || – || – || 12.0

Playoffs 

|-
|style="text-align:left;"|1965
|style="text-align:left;"|Baltimore
|10||–||42.7||.468||–||.663||15.1||3.4||–||–||20.9
|-
|style="text-align:left;"|1967
|style="text-align:left;"|New York
|4||–||39.3||.519||–||.586||16.5||3.0||–||–||18.3
|-
|style="text-align:left;"|1968
|style="text-align:left;"|New York
|6||–||46.2||.421||–||.625||16.0||3.5||–||–||20.0
|-
|style="text-align:left;"|1970
|style="text-align:left;"|Atlanta
|9||–||40.9||.468||–||.717||15.6||3.9||–||–||16.8
|-
|style="text-align:left;"|1971
|style="text-align:left;"|Atlanta
|5||–||43.2||.594||–||.759||14.4||2.0||–||–||20.8
|-
|style="text-align:left;"|1972
|style="text-align:left;"|Atlanta
|6||–||41.2||.488||–||.628||13.7||1.8||–||–||18.5
|-
|style="text-align:left;"|1973
|style="text-align:left;"|Atlanta
|6||–||41.2||.395||–||.452||12.2||2.2||–||–||13.7
|- class="sortbottom"
| style="text-align:center;" colspan="2"| Career
| 46 || – || 42.2 || .471 || – || .642 || 14.8 || 3.0 || – || – || 18.5

See also
List of National Basketball Association career scoring leaders
List of National Basketball Association career free throw scoring leaders
List of National Basketball Association career rebounding leaders
List of National Basketball Association career minutes played leaders
List of National Basketball Association top rookie scoring averages

References

External links

 Basketball Hall of Fame profile for Walt Bellamy
 Walt Bellamy's NBA career stats
 Walt Bellamy – A reflection

1939 births
2013 deaths
African-American basketball players
All-American college men's basketball players
Atlanta Hawks players
Baltimore Bullets (1963–1973) players
Basketball players at the 1960 Summer Olympics
Basketball players from North Carolina
Centers (basketball)
Chicago Packers draft picks
Chicago Packers players
Chicago Zephyrs players
Detroit Pistons players
Indiana Hoosiers men's basketball players
Medalists at the 1960 Summer Olympics
Naismith Memorial Basketball Hall of Fame inductees
National Basketball Association All-Stars
National Collegiate Basketball Hall of Fame inductees
New Orleans Jazz expansion draft picks
New Orleans Jazz players
New York Knicks players
Olympic gold medalists for the United States in basketball
Sportspeople from New Bern, North Carolina
United States men's national basketball team players
American men's basketball players
Burials at South-View Cemetery
20th-century African-American sportspeople
21st-century African-American people